Ford Theatre, spelled Ford Theater for the original radio version and known, in full, as The Ford Television Theatre for the TV version, is a radio and television anthology series broadcast in the United States in the 1940s and 1950s. At various times the television series appeared on all three major television networks, while the radio version was broadcast on two separate networks and on two separate coasts. Ford Theatre was named for its sponsor, the Ford Motor Company, which had an earlier success with its concert music series, The Ford Sunday Evening Hour (1934–42).

Radio
Ford Theater as a radio series lasted for only two seasons. Its first season was broadcast from New York City on NBC with such actors as Ed Begley, Shirley Booth, Gary Merrill, Everett Sloane and Vicki Vola. This season ran from October 5, 1947, to June 27, 1948. Due to poor ratings, Ford moved the show to Hollywood and CBS for the second season, where top Hollywood actors headed the casts. This season, which lasted from October 8, 1948, to July 1, 1949, received much higher ratings. However, with television rising in popularity, Ford decided to end its radio show and focus solely on television.

Howard Lindsay became the program's master of ceremonies on October 5, 1947.

Television

The first Ford Theatre on U.S. television appeared on October 17, 1948, near the beginning of regularly scheduled prime time network programming. It was an hour-long drama, broadcast live, as was most television of the era.  This series used primarily Broadway actors. The program began as a monthly series, switching to biweekly a year later, in alternation on Friday nights at 9:00 pm Eastern time with the 54th Street Revue. During this period, programming included adaptations of Little Women, with June Lockhart and Kim Hunter, and One Sunday Afternoon, with Burgess Meredith and Hume Cronyn. During the following season, the final season for the program on CBS, the alternation in the same time slot was with Magnavox Theater. Garth Montgomery was the producer, with Carl Beier as associate producer. Franklin Schaffner was the director.

A half-hour filmed Ford Theatre returned to the airwaves on NBC for the 1951–52 season on Thursday nights at 9:30 pm Eastern. At this time, production was moved from New York to Hollywood, and featured actors based there rather than on Broadway. Some of these programs were comedies instead of dramas. Performers appearing during this era included Frank Bank, Scott Brady, Claudette Colbert, Charles Coburn, Ed Hinton, Vivi Janiss, Peter Lawford, Sam Levene, Ida Lupino, Thomas Mitchell, Dennis Morgan, Karen Sharpe, Ann Sheridan, Barry Sullivan, and Beverly Washburn.  Also appearing for the first time together were Ronald Reagan and Nancy Davis, in an episode entitled "First Born," which first aired on February 3, 1953. In October 1954, Ford Theatre became the first network television series to be filmed regularly in color. During this period, Ford Theatre finished in the Nielsen ratings at number 30 for the 1952–1953 season, number seven in 1953–1954, number 9 in 1954–1955, and number 13 in 1955–1956.

After four seasons on NBC, the program was shown for a final season on ABC during the 1956–57 season. The time slot was changed to Wednesdays at 9:30 pm. The last prime time broadcast of Ford Theatre was on July 10, 1957.

From 9:00 to 9:30 p.m. on Saturdays during the summer of 1958, NBC broadcast the anthology series Opening Night, which consisted entirely of reruns of episodes of Ford Theatre from the 1956–1957 season. First aired on June 14, 1958, Opening Night was broadcast every other week, alternating in its time slot with Club Oasis with Spike Jones. Its final episode aired on September 8, 1958.

In 1954, Billboard voted Ford Theatre the best filmed network television drama series.

Episodes

Season 1 (1948–49)

Season 2 (1949–50)

Season 3 (1950–51)

Season 4 (1952–53)

Season 5 (1953–54)

Season 6 (1954–55)

Season 7 (1955–56)

Season 8 (1956–57)

See also

Academy Award
Author's Playhouse
The Campbell Playhouse
Cavalcade of America
The CBS Radio Workshop
The Cresta Blanca Hollywood Players
Curtain Time
General Electric Theater
Lux Radio Theatre
The Mercury Theatre on the Air
The MGM Theater of the Air
Screen Directors Playhouse
The Screen Guild Theater
Stars over Hollywood
Suspense
The United States Steel Hour
 For other TV series sponsored by Ford Motor Company, see Ford Festival, Ford Startime, The Ford Show, and Ford Star Jubilee

References

Further reading
Brooks, Tim and Marsh, Earle, The Complete Directory to Prime Time Network and Cable TV Shows 1946–Present
Audio Classics Archive Radio Logs: The Ford Theater

External links
The Definitive: Ford Theater – the radio series
Jerry Haendiges Vintage Radio Logs: Ford Theater

Ford Theatre at CVTA

Listen to

Watch
Episodes of the television version of Ford Theatre from the Internet Archive

1947 radio programme debuts
1949 radio programme endings
1948 American television series debuts
1957 American television series endings
1940s American radio programs
1940s American anthology television series
1950s American anthology television series
American Broadcasting Company original programming
American live television series
Black-and-white American television shows
CBS original programming
English-language television shows
NBC original programming
Television series by Screen Gems
Television series by Sony Pictures Television
Ford Motor Company
NBC radio programs
CBS Radio programs
Anthology radio series